New R. S. J. Public School (initialised as NRSJPS, the abbreviation standing for Recreational Study Junction), is a secular co-educational English medium private school located in Jhusi, Allahabad, India.

School 
The school runs from Class Nursery to Class Twelve. A branch at Vasant Vihar, Jhusi, Allahabad, runs from Class Nursery to Class Five. Another branch of the school is at Jamsedhpur.

The school has a house system of four houses (red, yellow, blue and green), which compete in events including an annual three-day sports contest.

Th school is private; in 2017 it was one of only 10 in the district to reveal its fees in response to a government request so that increases could be documented.

Campus 
The campus features a playground with an area of 9250 square meters, an 800 m track, and a basketball court. Trees were planted on the campus with the participation of Dainik Jagran, the Vasudha Foundation, the Allahabad Lions Club and the Forestry Department. For student safety and security, the school has a single gate entry/exit as well as modern fire detection and suppression equipment.

The school has its own fleet of buses, each with a driver, conductor, mobile phone, and fire-extinguisher.

The school at Chhatnag is divided into three wings: a junior school wing (Class Nursery to Class U.K.G.), a middle school wing (Class 1 to class 8), and a senior school wing (Class 9 to Class 12).

Facilities 
The school has laboratories for computer science, mathematics, physics, chemistry, biology and social studies. The library, which has separate junior and senior sections and is divided into sections by focus, has a total of 3,500 books, 300 reference books, two periodicals, and four magazines. Students have access to at least 4 newspapers every day. A language lab, including audiovisual materials, operates in the library.

Classrooms are equipped with interactive whiteboards. The school has a language lab in the library, art classes including dance (Indian and Western), music (Indian and Western), theater, and performing arts; a bookstore and stationery shop; and an infirmary. The school also conducts medical check-ups. There are school trips, and an annual function which has included dramatic and dance performances and a model parliament. Annual merit prizes are awarded to high-performing students.

Laboratories

School buildings and grounds

Sports 

The school offers basketball, badminton, football, and cricket, and has a 200-metre athletic track. Taekwondo is taught for self-defence, and instruction in yoga is also provided.

Academics
Students in Class 10 take the CBSE home examinations.

Students of Class 11 and 12 study the following subjects: 
 PCM + English + Elective
 PCB + English + Elective
 Arts + English + Elective
 Commerce + English + Elective

Following are the elective subjects:
 Hindi
 Computer
 Physical Education

References

External links

Media related to New R. S. J. Public School on Wikisource

Private schools in Uttar Pradesh
Primary schools in Uttar Pradesh
High schools and secondary schools in Uttar Pradesh
Education in Allahabad district
Educational institutions established in 2001
2001 establishments in Uttar Pradesh